Raniero Panzieri (14 February 1921 – Turin, 9 October 1964) was an Italian politician, writer and Marxist theoretician, considered as the founder of operaismo.

Biography
Raniero Panzieri was born in Rome. He lived in Sicily and was active in the ranks of the Italian Socialist Party. Whilst taking an active part in struggles for land reform, he began to write. In 1953 he became a member of the central committee of the PSI and then in 1957 the co-director of the theoretical review Mondo operaio (Workers World), which he turned into a discussion forum for the left of the party. During this period he translated Karl Marx's Capital into Italian.

At the 1959 congress of the Italian Socialist Party, he opposed the creation of a governmental accord with the Italian Christian Democratic Party. This led to his expulsion from the party.

He then moved to Turin, where he worked for the Einaudi publishing house. He forged links with several groups of militant trade unionists, socialists and dissident communists. Influenced by the French group Socialisme ou Barbarie he founded the Quaderni Rossi (Red Notebooks) review, together with Mario Tronti, Romano Alquati and Danilo Montaldi.
 
In the industrial revolt of the piazza Statuto in 1962 in Turin, Panzieri saw the emergence of the central role of the factory and the (factory) worker. The first editions of the review, which aimed at exploring the real life of the factory and the relationship of the workers to production, had a profound impact in the sphere of workplace struggles, as they departed from the habitual positions of the socialists and communists in this area. Mario Tronti would split off in 1963 to form the review Classe Operaia (Working Class).

This review was the cradle of operaismo (workerism), a Marxist tendency popular in Italy in the 1960s and 1970s. He died in Turin, aged 43.

Bibliography
Raniero Panzieri, "Socialist uses of workers' enquiry"
Raniero Panzieri, "Seven Theses on Workers' Control (1958)"
Raniero Panzieri, "Surplus value and planning: notes on the reading of Capital"

Raniero Panzieri: un uomo di frontiera, Editions Punto Rosso, 330 p.

Further reading
Steve Wright Storming Heaven: Class composition and struggle in Italian Autonomist Marxism (University of Michigan Press ) (Extract: The Workerists and the unions in Italy's 'Hot Autumn' at Libcom.org)

References

External links
 Uso socialista dell'inchiesta operaia, Quaderni Rossi, 1965.

Autonomism
Marxist theory
Syndicalism
Economic ideologies
Writers from Rome
1921 births
1964 deaths
Politicians from Rome
Italian magazine founders